"Can't Stop Raving" is a song by German electronic group Dune, released in 1995 as the third and last single from their debut album, Dune (1995). The female vocals are performed by Tina Lagao and Janine Kelly-Fiddes. The song achieved moderate success in Europe, peaking at number four in Spain, number seven in Germany, number nine in the Netherlands and number sixteen in Switzerland. The album version was used on Joel Veitch's Tales of the Blode as theme music.

Music video
A music video was produced to promote the single, directed by Delano Sookha.

Track listing
 CD single, Germany (1995)
"Can't Stop Raving" (Video Mix) – 3:33
"Can't Stop Raving" (12" Mix) – 5:07

 CD maxi, Europe (1995)
"Can't Stop Raving" (Video Mix) – 3:33
"Can't Stop Raving" (Club Mix) – 4:53
"Can't Stop Raving" (12 Inch Mix) – 5:10
"Can't Stop Raving" (Vocoder Mix) – 3:52

Charts

References

 

1995 singles
1995 songs
Dune (band) songs
English-language German songs
Songs written by Oliver Froning